Molle may refer to:

Places
 Mölle, Höganäs Municipality, Skåne County, Sweden; a town in southwestern Sweden
 Mollé, Kouka, Banwa, Burkina Faso; a town
 Cerro Molle, a mountain in Peru
 Molle Glacier, Antarctica
 Molle Islands, Queensland, Australia; an island group
 South Molle Island
 Molle Islands National Park
 Ponte Molle, a bridge over the Tiber River in Rome

People
 Molle (culture), a Precolumbian culture of Chile

Surnamed
 Angelo Dalle Molle (1908–2001) Italian businessman
 Jean Molle (born 1933), French sprint canoeist
 Joseph Boniface de La Molle (1526–1574) French nobleman who appears in Shakespeare
 Jules Molle (1868–1931) French politician
 Norbert Van Molle, Belgian sportshooter
 Robert Molle (born 1962) Canadian sportsman

Other uses
 MOLLE (military) (MOdular Lightweight Load-carrying Equipment), a version of load bearing gear used by the U.S. military
 Mollé Mystery Theatre, an American  anthology radio program, 1943 to 1948 sponsored initially by Sterling Drugs, manufacturers of Mollé Brushless Shaving Cream.
 Schinus molle, an evergreen tree native to Peru and Brazil

See also 

 Lille Molle (disambiguation)
 Mulli (disambiguation)
 Mollis (disambiguation)
 Molles (disambiguation)